Sacura is a genus of fish in the family Serranidae found in the Indian and Pacific Ocean.

Species
There are currently 5 recognized species in this genus:
 Sacura boulengeri (Heemstra, 1973) (Boulenger's sacura)
 Sacura margaritacea (Hilgendorf, 1879) (Cherry anthias)
 Sacura parva Heemstra & J. E. Randall, 1979 (Little fairy basslet)
 Sacura sanguinea Motomura, Yoshida & Vilasri, 2017  (Andaman deep-water anthias)
 Sacura speciosa Heemstra & J. E. Randall, 1979 (Purple-head sacura)

References

Anthiinae
Taxa named by David Starr Jordan
Taxa named by Robert Earl Richardson